Homewood Canyon-Valley Wells is a former census-designated place (CDP) in Inyo County, California, United States. The population was 75 at the 2000 census.

Prior to the 2010 census, it was dissolved into Homewood Canyon CDP and Valley Wells CDP.

Geography
Homewood Canyon-Valley Wells is located at  (35.844162, -117.339850).

Demographics
As of the census of 2000, there were 75 people, 35 households, and 24 families residing in the CDP. The population density was 1.4 people per square mile (0.5/km2). There were 58 housing units at an average density of 1.1 per square mile (0.4/km2). The racial makeup of the CDP was 93.33% White, 1.33% Asian, and 5.33% from two or more races. 6.67% of the population were Hispanic or Latino of any race.

There were 35 households, out of which 17.1% had children under the age of 18 living with them, 54.3% were married couples living together, 5.7% had a female householder with no husband present, and 28.6% were non-families. 25.7% of all households were made up of individuals, and 20.0% had someone living alone who was 65 years of age or older. The average household size was 2.14 and the average family size was 2.44.

In the CDP, the population was spread out, with 17.3% under the age of 18, 2.7% from 18 to 24, 17.3% from 25 to 44, 33.3% from 45 to 64, and 29.3% who were 65 years of age or older. The median age was 52 years. For every 100 females, there were 87.5 males. For every 100 females age 18 and over, there were 82.4 males.

The median income for a household in the CDP was $12,109, and the median income for a family was $12,109. Males had a median income of $0 versus $0 for females. The per capita income for the CDP was $7,999. There were 29.6% of families and 21.4% of the population living below the poverty line, including 19.4% of under eighteens and none of those over 64.

References

Former census-designated places in California
Unincorporated communities in Inyo County, California
Unincorporated communities in California